EusLisp is a Lisp-based programming system. Built on the basis of object orientation, it is designed specifically for developing robotics software. The first version of it ran in 1986 on Unix-System5/Ustation-E20.

References

External links
 Object-Oriented Concurrent Lisp with Solid Modeling Facilities: EusLisp

Object-oriented programming languages
Robot programming languages
Programming languages created in 1986
1986 in robotics
Lisp (programming language)
Lisp programming language family